The men's Greco-Roman heavyweight competition at the 1952 Summer Olympics in Helsinki took place from 24 July to 27 July at Messuhalli. Nations were limited to one competitor.

Competition format
This Greco-Roman wrestling competition continued to use the "bad points" elimination system introduced at the 1928 Summer Olympics for Greco-Roman and at the 1932 Summer Olympics for freestyle wrestling, removing the slight modification introduced in 1936 and used until 1948 (which had a reduced penalty for a loss by 2–1 decision). Each round featured all wrestlers pairing off and wrestling one bout (with one wrestler having a bye if there were an odd number). The loser received three points. The winner received one point if the win was by decision and zero points if the win was by fall. At the end of each round, any wrestler with at least five points was eliminated. This elimination continued until the medal rounds, which began when three wrestlers remained. These three wrestlers each faced each other in a round-robin medal round (with earlier results counting, if any had wrestled another before); record within the medal round determined medals, with bad points breaking ties.

Results

Round 1

 Bouts

 Points

Round 2

 Bouts

 Points

Round 3

 Bouts

 Points

Round 4

 Bouts

 Points

Medal rounds

Kotkas's victory over Kovanen in round 4 counted for the medal rounds.

 Bouts

 Points

Notes

References

Wrestling at the 1952 Summer Olympics